The Type 360 Cisitalia Grand Prix engine is a 1.5-liter, supercharged, flat-12 racing,
engine designed by Porsche and Cisitalia; between 1946 and 1947, and introduced in 1949, but never raced. It was intended to compete and race in Grand Prix racing, but when the FIA's new engine regulations banned forced induction for the 1952 Formula One season, the engine never got a chance to race.

Applications
Cisitalia Grand Prix

References

Porsche
Formula One engines
Porsche in motorsport